Mary Ann Wilson (born July 25, 1936) is an American nurse and TV fitness instructor. Wilson is also the founder and host of the award-winning exercise show Sit and Be Fit, which is broadcast on over 100 PBS television stations across the United States.

In 1987, Wilson started the PBS show Sit and Be Fit which includes a variety of exercises for the elderly and people with limited mobility. The show revolves around exercises that can be done while sitting in or using a chair, with little effort.

Background
Wilson graduated in 1959 from St. Francis Hospital and Rehabilitation Center in Pittsburgh, Pennsylvania. She began her career as a registered nurse specializing in geriatrics and post-polio rehab. In 1985, while teaching an aerobics class, she noticed her older adult clients suffering a high incidence of injury and attrition. In response, she designed a gentle program tailored to their needs. As students began reporting marked improvement in their physical and mental health, Wilson became convinced that there was a need for this type of exercise program on a national level. In 1987, KSPS-TV agreed to produce her Sit and Be Fit television series and distributed the first 30 episodes nationwide. Sit and Be Fit has aired regularly on PBS stations nationwide ever since.

Wilson is the author of several health and fitness publications, including Chair Exercise Basics and has been featured in columns on health in the aging community. She educates healthcare and fitness professionals at national and international health conferences.

In 2010, Wilson served as a national spokesperson for the Prevent DVT coalition. In 2017 she was inducted into the National Fitness Hall of Fame. 

Wilson's current activities and history include:
Registered Nurse
Executive Producer/Host, SIT AND BE FIT television series
Executive Director/Founder, SIT AND BE FIT non-profit organization
Nationally certified by American Council on Exercise 
Member, ASA (American Society on Aging)
Member, NCOA (National Council on the  Aging)
Member, SFA (American Senior Fitness Association) National Advisory Board
Member, FEOAA (Fitness Educators Of Active Adults)
Presenter, IDEA Conventions: 1987, 1988,  1989, 1991, 1995, 1996
Presenter, 1st International Conference, Prevention: the  Key Health for Life, 1994
Presenter, 4th International Congress, Physical Activity,  Aging and Sports, Heidelberg, Germany, 1996

Personal life
Wilson and her daughter, Gretchen Wilson Paukert, (born 1961) who produces and directs the Sit and Be Fit programs her mother hosts, also appear together in the Boomer Be Fit DVD, which Paukert hosts. They reside in Spokane, Washington, where the Sit and Be Fit TV program and the SABF organization, which is non-profit, both are based.

References

Living people
1936 births
American nurses
American women nurses
American exercise instructors
People from Pittsburgh
Television personalities from Pittsburgh